Persatuan Sepakbola Manado (simply known as Persma Manado) is an Indonesian football club based in Manado, North Sulawesi. They currently compete in the Liga 3.

References 

Manado
Football clubs in North Sulawesi
Football clubs in Indonesia
Association football clubs established in 1960
1960 establishments in Indonesia